Estimation theory is a branch of statistics that deals with estimating the values of parameters based on measured empirical data that has a random component.  The parameters describe an underlying physical setting in such a way that their value affects the distribution of the measured data. An estimator attempts to approximate the unknown parameters using the measurements.
In estimation theory, two approaches are generally considered:

 The probabilistic approach (described in this article) assumes that the measured data is random with probability distribution dependent on the parameters of interest
 The set-membership approach assumes that the measured data vector belongs to a set which depends on the parameter vector.

Examples 
For example, it is desired to estimate the proportion of a population of voters who will vote for a particular candidate.  That proportion is the parameter sought; the estimate is based on a small random sample of voters. Alternatively, it is desired to estimate the probability of a voter voting for a particular candidate, based on some demographic features, such as age.

Or, for example, in radar the aim is to find the range of objects (airplanes, boats, etc.) by analyzing the two-way transit timing of received echoes of transmitted pulses. Since the reflected pulses are unavoidably embedded in electrical noise, their measured values are randomly distributed, so that the transit time must be estimated.

As another example, in electrical communication theory, the measurements which contain information regarding the parameters of interest are often associated with a noisy signal.

Basics 
For a given model, several statistical "ingredients" are needed so the estimator can be implemented. The first is a statistical sample – a set of data points taken from a random vector (RV) of size N. Put into a vector,

 

Secondly, there are M parameters

 

whose values are to be estimated. Third, the continuous probability density function (pdf) or its discrete counterpart, the probability mass function (pmf), of the underlying distribution that generated the data must be stated conditional on the values of the parameters:

 

It is also possible for the parameters themselves to have a probability distribution (e.g., Bayesian statistics). It is then necessary to define the Bayesian probability

 

After the model is formed, the goal is to estimate the parameters, with the estimates commonly denoted , where the "hat" indicates the estimate.

One common estimator is the minimum mean squared error (MMSE) estimator, which utilizes the error between the estimated parameters and the actual value of the parameters

 

as the basis for optimality.  This error term is then squared and the expected value of this squared value is minimized for the MMSE estimator.

Estimators

Commonly used estimators (estimation methods) and topics related to them include:
Maximum likelihood estimators
Bayes estimators
Method of moments estimators
Cramér–Rao bound
Least squares
Minimum mean squared error (MMSE), also known as Bayes least squared error (BLSE)
Maximum a posteriori (MAP)
Minimum variance unbiased estimator (MVUE)
Nonlinear system identification
Best linear unbiased estimator (BLUE)
Unbiased estimators — see estimator bias.
Particle filter
Markov chain Monte Carlo (MCMC)
Kalman filter, and its various derivatives
Wiener filter

Examples

Unknown constant in additive white Gaussian noise
Consider a received discrete signal, of  independent samples that consists of an unknown constant  with additive white Gaussian noise (AWGN)  with zero mean and known variance  (i.e.).

The model for the signal is then
 

Two possible (of many) estimators for the parameter  are:
 
  which is the sample mean

and

At this point, these two estimators would appear to perform the same.
However, the difference between them becomes apparent when comparing the variances.

and

It would seem that the sample mean is a better estimator since its variance is lower for every N > 1.

Maximum likelihood

Continuing the example using the maximum likelihood estimator, the probability density function (pdf) of the noise for one sample  is

and the probability of  becomes ( can be thought of a )

By independence, the probability of  becomes

Taking the natural logarithm of the pdf

and the maximum likelihood estimator is

Taking the first derivative of the log-likelihood function

and setting it to zero

This results in the maximum likelihood estimator

which is simply the sample mean.
From this example, it was found that the sample mean is the maximum likelihood estimator for  samples of a fixed, unknown parameter corrupted by AWGN.

Cramér–Rao lower bound

To find the Cramér–Rao lower bound (CRLB) of the sample mean estimator, it is first necessary to find the Fisher information number

and copying from above

Taking the second derivative

and finding the negative expected value is trivial since it is now a deterministic constant

Finally, putting the Fisher information into

results in

In other words, the sample mean is the (necessarily unique) efficient estimator, and thus also the minimum variance unbiased estimator (MVUE), in addition to being the maximum likelihood estimator.

Maximum of a uniform distribution

One of the simplest non-trivial examples of estimation is the estimation of the maximum of a uniform distribution. It is used as a hands-on classroom exercise and to illustrate basic principles of estimation theory. Further, in the case of estimation based on a single sample, it demonstrates philosophical issues and possible misunderstandings in the use of maximum likelihood estimators and likelihood functions.

Given a discrete uniform distribution  with unknown maximum, the UMVU estimator for the maximum is given by

where m is the sample maximum and k is the sample size, sampling without replacement. This problem is commonly known as the German tank problem, due to application of maximum estimation to estimates of German tank production during World War II.

The formula may be understood intuitively as;
"The sample maximum plus the average gap between observations in the sample",
the gap being added to compensate for the negative bias of the sample maximum as an estimator for the population maximum.

This has a variance of

This can be seen as a very simple case of maximum spacing estimation.

The sample maximum is the maximum likelihood estimator for the population maximum, but, as discussed above, it is biased.

Applications 

Numerous fields require the use of estimation theory.
Some of these fields include:
 Interpretation of scientific experiments
 Signal processing
 Clinical trials
 Opinion polls
 Quality control
 Telecommunications
 Project management
 Software engineering
 Control theory (in particular Adaptive control)
 Network intrusion detection system
 Orbit determination

Measured data are likely to be subject to noise or uncertainty and it is through statistical probability that optimal solutions are sought to extract as much information from the data as possible.

See also 

 Best linear unbiased estimator (BLUE)
 Completeness (statistics)
 Detection theory
 Efficiency (statistics)
 Expectation-maximization algorithm (EM algorithm)
 Fermi problem
 Grey box model
 Information theory
 Least-squares spectral analysis
 Matched filter
 Maximum entropy spectral estimation
 Nuisance parameter
 Parametric equation
 Pareto principle
 Rule of three (statistics)
 State estimator
 Statistical signal processing
 Sufficiency (statistics)

Notes

References

Citations

Sources

 Theory of Point Estimation by E.L. Lehmann and G. Casella.
 Systems Cost Engineering by Dale Shermon.
 Mathematical Statistics and Data Analysis by John Rice.
 Fundamentals of Statistical Signal Processing: Estimation Theory by Steven M. Kay
 An Introduction to Signal Detection and Estimation by H. Vincent Poor
 Detection, Estimation, and Modulation Theory, Part 1 by Harry L. Van Trees (website)
 Optimal State Estimation: Kalman, H-infinity, and Nonlinear Approaches by Dan Simon website
 Ali H. Sayed, Adaptive Filters, Wiley, NJ, 2008, .
 Ali H. Sayed, Fundamentals of Adaptive Filtering, Wiley, NJ, 2003, .
 Thomas Kailath, Ali H. Sayed, and Babak Hassibi, Linear Estimation, Prentice-Hall, NJ, 2000, .
 Babak Hassibi, Ali H. Sayed, and Thomas Kailath, Indefinite Quadratic Estimation and Control: A Unified Approach to H2 and H Theories, Society for Industrial & Applied Mathematics (SIAM), PA, 1999, .
 V.G.Voinov, M.S.Nikulin, "Unbiased estimators and their applications. Vol.1: Univariate case",  Kluwer Academic Publishers, 1993, .
 V.G.Voinov, M.S.Nikulin, "Unbiased estimators and their applications. Vol.2: Multivariate case",  Kluwer Academic Publishers, 1996, .

External links

 
Signal processing
Mathematical and quantitative methods (economics)